Araya Mengesha(born July 23, 1987) is a Canadian actor, best known for his roles as Kandae in Nurse.Fighter.Boy, Michael in Cul de sac and Zoffi in Ruby Skye P.I.: The Maltese Puppy.

Biography 
Mengesha was born in Toronto to Ethiopian-Canadian International business consultant Stefanos Mengesha Seyoum and Eritrean-Canadian Selamawit Kiros. Through his father, he is a member of the Imperial family of Ethiopia. He is the cousin of theatre director Weyni Mengesha.

From 2002 to 2009, together with David Acer and Christina Broccolini he was a presenter of the documentary television series Mystery Hunters.

His short film Defund, co-directed with Khadijah Roberts-Abdullah, premiered at the 2021 Toronto International Film Festival, and was named to TIFF's annual year-end Canada's Top Ten list for 2021.

Filmography

References

External links
 

Canadian male television actors
Living people
Male actors from Toronto
21st-century Canadian male actors
Canadian people of Eritrean descent
Canadian people of Ethiopian descent
Canadian Screen Award winners
Black Canadian male actors
Film directors from Toronto
Black Canadian filmmakers
1987 births